Jelovik may refer to:

 Jelovik (Aranđelovac), a village in Serbia
 Jelovik (Bajina Bašta), a village in Serbia